Eric Allandale (born Eric Allandale Dubuisson 4 March 1936 – 23 August 2001) was a trombonist, songwriter, and bandleader.

Early life
A native of Dominica, West Indies, he moved to the U.K. in 1954 to complete his education. He joined the Hammersmith Borough Brass Band as a trumpeter while working as its council surveyor. He later switched to trombone and formed an amateur band playing jazz.

Beginning 1958 he performed at the Cellar Club in Soho, then joined bands led by Teddy Layton and Sonny Morris. During the 1960s, he was a member of the Terry Lightfoot and Alex Welsh bands and played with Edmundo Ros. He played trombone and sang in the blues band Dillingers with saxophonist Don Mackrill and bassist Ronnie Shapiro, the brother of Helen Shapiro.

Allandale appears to have been involved with a group called Romeo Z. A promotional release of "Come Back Baby Come Back" backed with "Since My Baby Said Goodbye" was released by CBSon 31 March 1967. He co-wrote both songs. During the previous year, Romeo Z contributed a song to the film Kaleidoscope. A single-sided promo 45 of the track was released on KAL 1.

New Orleans Knights

In the early 1960s Allandale led the New Orleans Knights, possibly also referred to as The Jazz Knights, who were regulars on the trad jazz circuit. The New Orleans Knights included drummer Colin Miller who, years later, joined the Chris Barber Band; banjo player Eddie Edwards; and drummer Laurie Chescoe.

Two singles were released as the Landsdowne Jazz Series by Columbia in the UK in 1962. One of the singles, "Little Hans", had Allandale credited as the new music arranger.

The Foundations

In 1967 he became a member of the multi-racial English soul group The Foundations, playing in the horn section with Jamaican saxophonists Mike Elliott and Pat Burke. He played on their hits "Baby, Now That I've Found You", "Back on My Feet Again", "Build Me Up Buttercup" and "In the Bad Bad Old Days" and was a member of the band until it broke up in 1970.

Songwriting
He wrote a number of songs that were recorded by the Foundations as well as other artists. The first appearance of his song writing efforts was on the flip side of the Foundations third single, "Any Old Time (You're Lonely And Sad)" called "We Are Happy People". This song was also recorded by a Scandinavian group called Slams Creepers, backed with "I Just Couldn't Get You Out of My Mind" and released in 1968 on Bill BT 128. It was also released as the flip side to a 1969 single, "Remains To Be Seen", recorded by Irish show band The Pacific Show Band, released on Tribune TRS 125. It was also re-recorded by The Foundations featuring Colin Young and appeared on their 1968 Marble Arch album.

Other songs written by him was the Foundations minor hit "Born to Live, Born to Die" which Allandale served as musical director. "I Can Feel It", "Who Am I ?" and "Solomon Grundy". This latter song which appeared on the album, Digging The Foundations, was covered by Pye labelmates Pickettywitch, and a Hong Kong-based beat group, Danny Diaz & The Checkmates. It was the song that Polly Brown and Pickettywitch were first noticed with when they appeared on ITV's Opportunity Knocks television talent show. It was also the B-side of Pickettywitch's 1969 debut single "You've Got Me So I Don't Know". In 1972 a group called Tramp Sonic released a single on RCA called "You're A Man" backed with "Catch A Southbound Train". Allandale wrote the tunes for both sides as well as produced them. "You're a Man" appeared on the Hits Vol.3 Dance Classics album in 1992. The song was credited to Tramps.

With James Mpungo he wrote "Ave Africa", which appears on Sunburst's 1976 album.

Later years
Some time after the Foundations broke up he went to Zambia with a soul band to play for its independence celebrations. He also joined other musicians in a band that played African jazz and the band became popular locally. He taught music to students in Zambia. learned carving crafts, and then moved to Kenya. He was  a member of the band Sunburst and played on the group's 1976 album, Ave Africa.

After four years in Africa he returned to England. In 1977 he played jazz with Laurie Chescoe, a former bandmate from his early jazz years. He tried to reunite with Tim Harris, the former drummer for The Foundations, but was unsuccessful. He opened a junk shop with his partner Olive in Peckham, South London.

In 1981 Allandale went to Paris and worked with Sam Woodyard, former drummer with the Duke Ellington orchestra. He moved to a commune near the Pyrenees and was a founding member of the St Andre Blues Band. In 1983 he returned to England and started a relationship with an artist called Simone and began painting. He worked with an Afro-Caribbean group and later moved back to Paris. In 1989 he had a brain haemorrhage but recovered enough to play the keyboard. He suffered a stroke in 1999 and died on 23 August 2001 at the age of 65.

Discography
 Romeo Z - "Come Back Baby Come Back" / "Since My Baby Said Goodbye" - CBS, 1967 - (co writer sides A&B)
 Tramp Sonic - "You're a Man" / "Catch a Southbound Train" - RCA 1972 (producer and writer, sides A&B)

New Orleans Knights releases
 1962: "Little Hans" / "Dominican Carnival" (Columbia)
 1962: "Enjoy Yourself (It's Later than You Think)" / "In a Little Spanish Town" (Columbia)

New Orleans Knights members
 Eric Allandale – trombone and bandleader
 Jeff Brown – trumpet
 Will Hastie – clarinet
 Eddie Edwards – banjo
 Jim Goudie – bass
 Colin Miller – drums
 Laurie Chescoe – drums (1959)

References

1936 births
2001 deaths
Dominica musicians
British songwriters
British jazz trombonists
Male trombonists
English people of Dominica descent
The Foundations members
20th-century trombonists
British male jazz musicians
20th-century British male musicians
20th-century British musicians